Anolis punctatus, the spotted anole or Amazon green anole, is a species of lizard in the family Dactyloidae. The species is found in Brazil, Venezuela, Guyana, Peru, Ecuador, Colombia, and Bolivia.

References

Anoles
Reptiles described in 1802
Taxa named by François Marie Daudin